Discocotyle is a genus of flatworms belonging to the family Discocotylidae.

The species of this genus are found in Europe and Northern America.

Species:
 Discocotyle ohridana Stojanovski, Hristovski, Baker, Cakic, Djikanovic, Stojanovic, Paunovic, Kulisic & Hristovski, 2005
 Discocotyle sagittata (Leuckart, 1842) Diesing, 1850 
 Discocotyle salmonis

References

Polyopisthocotylea
Monogenea genera